The Aquarius 23 is an American trailerable sailboat that was designed by Peter Barrett and Stan Miller as a cruiser and first built in 1969.

The design was developed into several derivative models, the Aquarius 23-2, the Aquarius 7.0 and the Balboa 23.

Production
The family of designs was built by Coastal Recreation, Inc in the United States from 1969 to 1981, when the company went out of business.

Design
The Aquarius 23 family are all recreational keelboats, built predominantly of fiberglass, with balsa-cored decks. The hulls all have a slightly raked stems, slightly angled transoms, rudders controlled by a tiller and cabin "pop-tops".

The boat is normally fitted with a small  outboard motor for docking and maneuvering.

The design has sleeping accommodation for five people, with a double "V"-berth in the bow cabin and two straight settees in the main cabin. There is a drop leaf table located at the long berth. The galley is located on the port side just forward of the companionway ladder. The head is located just aft of the bow cabin on the port side.

Variants
Aquarius 23
This base model was introduced in 1969 and produced until 1976. It has a swing keel, a fractional sloop, tall rig or optional masthead sloop rig. The rudder is a retractable spade-type.
Balboa 23
This model was introduced in 1969. It has a swing keel and a fractional rig.
Aquarius 23-2
This model was introduced in 1970, was produced until 1977. It has fixed fin keel, fractional rig, or optional masthead sloop rig. The rudder is a spade-type.
Aquarius 7.0
This model was introduced in 1976 and production had ended by the time the company went out of business in 1981. This version brought a number of modifications, including a transom-mounted rudder.

Operational history
In a 2010 review Steve Henkel faulted the boat's aesthetics, writing, "because the freeboard is very high, partly to provide more than usual headroom for a 23-foot boat, she looks high and boxy."

See also
List of sailing boat types

Related development
Aquarius 21
Balboa 16
Balboa 20
Balboa 21
Balboa 22
Balboa 24

References

Keelboats
1960s sailboat type designs
Sailing yachts
Trailer sailers
Sailboat type designs by Peter Barrett
Sailboat types built by Coastal Recreation, Inc